The 1906 Iowa Hawkeyes football team represented the University of Iowa in the 1906 college football season. This was Mark Catlin Sr.'s first season as head coach of the Hawkeyes.

Schedule

References

Iowa
Iowa Hawkeyes football seasons
Iowa Hawkeyes football